Saracen, also known as Sarazin, Sarasen and Sarasin, was a French-Quapaw man known during the 1800s by some European Americans as an honorary "chief".  Saracen witnessed the removal of his people from traditional land in Arkansas to Indian Territory. Because of his mixed-blood, he had no hereditary right to the role of chief. But Anglo-Americans considered him a chief because of his  deeds. 

Morris S. Arnold, a 21st-century historian of colonial Arkansas, notes that while the white neighbors considered Saracen a hero, he "did not fare nearly so well among many of the Quapaws." He suggests that Saracen felt that he was a "person in between" cultures.

Biography

Saracen (as he is known in English-language accounts) was born at Arkansas Post, Arkansas, around 1763; this had been part of territory claimed by France as La Louisiane. His father, François Sazarin (c. 1720s-1763), was an interpreter at Arkansas Post, and the son of ethnic French parents Nicholas Sazarin and Anne Rolland who were settlers there.

François married or had a common-law union (also called "the custom of the country") with a Quapaw woman, who was mother of the boy Saracen/Sarazin. He was raised as a Quapaw. François is recorded as formally having married Marie Lepine, an ethnic French woman, in 1752, but it is not known how long she lived.  The Pine Bluff Commercial credited her in a 2019 article as Saracen's mother,  but this does not seem as likely given the social dynamics of the period. The Quapaw Nation says that Saracen/Sarasen had a Quapaw mother.

Local European-American settlers credited Saracen as a hero for having saved two white children who were kidnapped by Chickasaw from a family of trappers near Pine Bluff. Saracen rowed down the Arkansas River the night of the abduction and located a Chickasaw camp near Arkansas Post, where Saracen "lifted up his tomahawk and gave the Quapaw war cry". The Chickasaw fled, leaving the children behind. For his action, Saracen was presented the Presidential Medal by James Miller, Governor of the Arkansas Territory. During the 1820s, he was also appointed by Miller as chief of the Quapaw, although he had no hereditary claim to that position. 

Saracen was one of two signatories to a treaty in 1824 in which the Quapaw were pressured to cede land in Arkansas to the United States government in exchange for land with the Caddo people on the Red River in northeastern Louisiana.  The Quapaw moved there in early 1826. After floods destroyed their crops, 60 people died of starvation, including Saracen's wife. Saracen led one-fourth of the Quapaw back to land reserved for them on the Arkansas River, which they reached in 1827.

In a letter dated January 10, 1827, written by Territorial Governor George Izard, to William H. Keating, a geologist affiliated with the American Philosophical Society, Izard said that Saracen was:
a half-breed...who is the most distinguished of their warriors. This hero, poet and musician ranks as a Chief in some respects; he is permitted to wear medals and assist at their Councils, but his honours are altogether personal and will not descend to his eldest son, as is the case with the other Chiefs whose blood is purely Indian.

During this time, the Quapaw were being treated harshly by the American government. They splintered into two assemblies, those led by chief Heckaton, the traditional leader, and those who were grouped with Saracen by James Miller, Governor of the Arkansas Territory. Miller appointed Saracen as chief of the latter group. 

In 1833, Saracen was a signatory to a treaty with the US in which the Quapaw agreed to cede their territory in Arkansas, and to relocate to the northeastern corner of the Indian Territory. Saracen did not go to the new reservation. He led 300 Quapaw back to the Red River in Louisiana. Saracen returned to Arkansas, where he lived in Jefferson County until his death.

The gravestone of Sarasen (this spelling more typical of French) at St. Joseph Catholic Cemetery in Pine Bluff is inscribed, "Friend of the Missionaries. Rescuer of captive children."  It inaccurately states he died in 1832, as he is documented as living beyond that year.

Legacy
Lake Pine Bluff, a  lake in downtown Pine Bluff, was renamed as Lake Saracen in his honor in 2007.

A public art display in Pine Bluff includes a mural by Robert Dafford dedicated to "Quapaw Chief Saracen, rescuer of the stolen children and legendary hero of Jefferson County".

Saracen Casino Resort in Pine Bluff, opened by the Quapaw Nation in 2019, is named in Saracen's honor.

References

Further reading

 Arnold, Morris S. The Rumble of a Distant Drum: the Quapaws and the Old World Newcomers, 1673-1804, Univ of Arkansas Press, 2007.
 Baird, W. David. The Quapaw Indians: a History of the Downstream People, University of Oklahoma Press, 1980.
 Dubuisson, Ann. “François Sarazin: Interpreter at Arkansas Post during the Chickasaw Wars”, in  Arkansas Historical Quarterly, 71, No. 3, Autumn 2012.
Izard, George. “Brief Notes Respecting the Territory of Arkansas”. Letter received by William H. Keating of the American Philosophical Society, 10 Jan. 1827.
 Key, P. Joseph. “Outcasts upon the World”: The Louisiana Purchase and the Quapaws”, in Arkansas Historical Quarterly, 62, No. 3, Autumn 2003.
 Lyon, Owen. “The Trail of the Quapaw”. Arkansas Historical Quarterly, 9, No. 3, Autumn 1950.
 Nieberding, Velma. “The Quapaws: those who went downstream”. Gregath Publishers for the Dobson Museum, 1999.
 Thompson, Laura Hinderks, “Historical Translation of Antoine Barraque Manuscript”, in Arkansas Historical Quarterly, 40, Autumn 1981.
“The Dust of Chief Saracen Laid to Rest in Catholic Cemetery at Pine Bluff Saturday”, Arkansas Democrat, Little Rock, AR, January 24, 1905.
 “Arkansas Notes”, Fort Smith Times, Fort Smith, AR, October 30, 1907
 “Muster Rolls of Quapaws from Arkansas”, Miscellaneous Indian Removal Muster Rolls, 1832-1846, Washington DC: National Archives and Records Administration.

Native American leaders
People from Arkansas County, Arkansas
People from Jefferson County, Arkansas
Chiefs of the Quapaw Nation